(known before 2012 as  is a Japanese video-sharing service on the web. "Niconico" or "nikoniko" is the Japanese ideophone for smiling. As of 2021, Niconico is the 34th most-visited website in Japan, according to Alexa Internet.

The site won the Japanese Good Design Award in 2007, and an Honorary Mention of the Digital Communities category at Prix Ars Electronica 2008.

Features 
Users can upload, view, and share video clips. Unlike other video sharing sites, however, comments are overlaid directly onto the video, synced to specific playback times. This feature allows comments to respond directly to events occurring in the video, in sync with the viewer—creating a sense of a shared watching experience. Together with Hiroyuki Nishimura serving as director at Niwango until February 2013, Niconico's atmosphere and cultural context are close to 2channel's or Futaba Channel's. Many popular videos on this site have otaku tastes, such as anime, computer games, and pop music. Niconico offers a feature for users (not just the uploader of the video) to tag videos. Each video may have up to eleven tags, of which up to five the uploader may lock. Frequently, this functionality can be used not only as categorization, but also as critical commentary, satire, or other humor related to the video's content. The site is also known for its MAD videos and its medleys of popular songs on the website, most notably Kumikyoku Nico Nico Douga. Niconico also distributed some original net animations, such as Candy Boy, Tentai Senshi Sunred, and Penguin Musume Heart.

Other features include:
 Mylist: each user may create "mylists", which function similarly to a list of bookmarks. Users can have up to 25 mylist folders, but the number of videos per folder depends on the user's membership status. A basic account can have 100 videos per folder, while a premium (paid) account has five times that amount (500). Under this limit, a free member can have up to 2,500 mylisted videos, while premium members can mylist up to 12,500 videos. Daily mylist activity is used to compute the default ranking view, although one may also sort by view or comment count. Mylists may be optionally made public and linked to; for example, to make a list of uploader's works (e.g., original songs or gameplay videos).
 Uploader comments: the uploader of a video may attach permanent comments to the video. This feature is suitable for some cases as subtitles, lyrics, or corrections.
 Nicoscript: by using special commands in the uploader comments, the uploader can add special effects to the video, including voting, automatic transfer to another video, quiz scoring, and other features.

History 

The first version of Niconico used YouTube as a video source. When the site grew, YouTube's server infrastructure strained due to increased traffic and bandwidth, leading YouTube to make a decision to block access from Niconico. As a result, Niconico ceased operations, but two weeks later, the site relaunched with an on-premises video server. On May 7, 2007, Niconico announced a mobile phone version of the website. Since August 9, 2007, "Nico Nico Douga (RC) Mobile" has serviced mobile phones of NTT DoCoMo and au.

As of October 31, 2011, Niconico has over 23,690,000 registered users, 6,870,000 mobile users and 1,390,000 premium users. Due to the limited server capacity, Niwango limits the number of free users who can access the website at peak times (7 p.m. to 2 a.m.), based on the time of registration. The website is in Japanese, and the majority of the site traffic is from Japan, although approximately four percent is from outside Japan, notably one percent from Taiwan. Niconico launched a Taiwanese version of the site on October 18, 2007. In July 2008, Niconico launched German and Spanish-language versions of the site, followed by an update for the Taiwanese-language version. An English-language version was added on October 17, 2012, superseding the Niconico.com website, with translation functionality allowing users to translate video descriptions into English or Chinese.

On April 27, 2012, Nico Nico Douga announced it would be rebranding itself as Niconico. The site also introduced a new "Zero" update, which improves video resolution, along with various other upgrades.

Niconico launched for the Nintendo Switch in Japan on July 13, 2017, and was the Switch's first third-party media app in any market.

Niconico.com 
In 2010, an English version was in the works, and in April 2011, an English-language beta website, Niconico, was launched. Unlike the Japanese counterpart of Niconico (nicovideo.jp), Niconico.com hosted videos from YouTube, DailyMotion, and Niconico. Similar to the pre-2007 version of Niconico, users can view the hosted videos via a version of the Niconico player, complete with commenting and tagging systems. Niconico.com later introduced video upload and (for Premium users) live streaming functionalities. The site also simulcast select anime titles from June 2011. On October 14, 2011, Niconico announced a partnership with Funimation Entertainment to form Funico, to handle licensing of anime properties for streaming and home video. With the implementation of English language features into Nicovideo.jp, Niconico.com was retired on November 19, 2012, and now redirects to the Japanese website.

In March 2018, Niconico announced the end of English-language community services.

In October and November 2018, DDoS attacks from outside Japan led to disconnected services for some areas outside the country to combat these attacks.

In September 2019, Nico Nico Douga's headquarters were closed.

Business aspects

Income 
The main income of Niconico comes from premium membership subscriptions, advertisements, and Nico Nico Ichiba (Affiliate).

 Premium membership

Until early 2019, users need to register an account to watch videos on Niconico. There are two types of registered accounts; free (basic tier) and premium (subscription) accounts. The premium membership fee is ¥550 per month or ¥6,600 per year. As of January 2, 2012, they reached 1,500,000 premium members. Users can purchase a premium subscription via PayPal. Japanese users can also pay with mobile, credit card, Line Pay, and WebMoney.

 Advertisement

Niconico uses Google Ads and other web advertisements. On May 8, 2008, Dwango announced a partnership with Yahoo! Japan and plans to adopt search-related ads and other Yahoo-related services.

 Nico Nico Ichiba (Affiliate)

Nico Nico Ichiba is a unique advertisement system in which users can place banners freely on each video page. Uploaders and viewers can choose which items they want to place in the advertisement banners. Users also can know how many clicks each banner accrued, and how many items purchased. Ranking info of numbers of items bought through Nico Nico Ichiba is also officially provided. Items available are from Amazon.co.jp, Yahoo Shopping, and Dwango mobile service.

As of July 2010, Nico Nico Ichiba has been extended to the Taiwanese website.

Financial condition 

On October 30, 2007, Dwango and the JASRAC (a Japanese copyright holders' society) agreed to form a comprehensive partnership. For this agreement, Dwango will pay two percent of its earnings to JASRAC as copyright royalties.

In the fiscal year from Q4 2010 to Q3 2011, Niconico has had a gross income of approximately 10.81 billion yen (US$139.1 million as of November 10, 2011), and posts a 670 million yen (US$8.6 million) operating profit.

See also 

 Acfun
 Bilibili
 Danmu
 Gachimuchi
 FC2
 Hatsune Miku
 Kumikyoku Nico Nico Douga
 Pixiv
 Viddsee
 Vkontakte
 YouTube
 zoome

References

External links 

  

2006 establishments in Japan
Anime and manga websites
Dwango (company)
Kadokawa Corporation subsidiaries
Internet properties established in 2006
Japanese entertainment websites
Video hosting
Video on demand services